Edward Francis Maitland, Lord Barcaple  (1803–1870) was a Scottish advocate and judge and Senator of the College of Justice.

Life

He was born at 36 George Square in Edinburgh on 16 April 1803, the son of Adam Maitland of Dundrennan. He was educated at the High School in Edinburgh then studied law at the University of Edinburgh, graduating with an MA.

The brother of Thomas Maitland, Lord Dundrennan, he became an advocate in 1831, and served in government as Solicitor General for Scotland from 1855–1858 and from 1859–1862. He was appointed a Lord of Session, with the judicial title Lord Barcaple, in 1862. In the same year he was elected a Fellow of the Royal Society of Edinburgh his proposer was James Thomson Gibson-Craig.

He served as Sheriff of Argyllshire from 9 July 1851, until becoming solicitor-general for Scotland under Lord Palmerston from 14 February 1855 to 17 March 1858, and from 27 June 1859 to 10 November 1862.

As a lord of the court of session, with the title of Lord Barcaple, he sat on the bench from 10 November 1862 till his death. He was curator and assessor of the University of Edinburgh in 1859, and rector of the University of Aberdeen in 1860. The University of Edinburgh awarded him an honorary doctorate (LLD) in later life.

He died at 3 Ainslie Place, on the Moray Estate in west Edinburgh, on 23 February 1870. He is buried on the north wall of Dean Cemetery adjacent to the central gap leading to the north extension.

Family

In 1840, he married Emily Roberts (1813–1854) a daughter of William Roberts, a Glasgow banker.

They had daughters Ann Maitland (1852–1915) and Helen (1846–1915) and a son Thomas (1849–1929).

Arms

References

 

1803 births
1870 deaths
Members of the Faculty of Advocates
Barcaple
Scottish politicians
Rectors of the University of Aberdeen
Fellows of the Royal Society of Edinburgh
Lawyers from Edinburgh
Solicitors General for Scotland
People educated at the Royal High School, Edinburgh
Alumni of the University of Edinburgh
19th-century Scottish judges